John Blythe (October 4, 1849 – ?) was an Ontario farmer and political figure. He represented Grey South in the Legislative Assembly of Ontario from 1883 to 1890 as a Conservative member.

He was born in Guelph, Canada West in 1849, the son of Alexander Wright Blythe, a Scottish immigrant. In 1871, he married Jane Peteo.

Blythe served as reeve for Normanby Township.

References

External links 
 

1849 births
Progressive Conservative Party of Ontario MPPs
Year of death missing